Loyola High School is a private, Roman Catholic, co-educational high school in Kurji, Patna, Bihar, India. It was established in 1969 and administered by the Montfort Brothers of St. Gabriel. 
  
It is a co-educational school and the medium of instruction is English.

History
Loyola High School was established in 1969 by the Montfort Brothers of St. Gabriel (Ranchi Province). It was originally a boys-only school.

Loyola High School was affiliated with the Bihar School Examination Board in 1976 but switched to the Central Board of Secondary Education (CBSE) in 1993.

The school expanded to include a senior secondary section on 1 April 2000 and again in 2005 to include a Montessori section, named Montfort Montessori Home.

Notable alumni 
Loyola has an alumni association and maintains a database of all former students. The primary objective of the association is to promote and maintain contact among the ex-students and to help the school with matters concerning its promotion, development and welfare.

 Ravish Kumar, TV anchor, writer, journalist and media personality

Gallery

References 

Schools in Patna
Christian schools in Bihar
Private schools in Bihar
Catholic secondary schools in India
Brothers of Christian Instruction of St Gabriel schools
Educational institutions established in 1969
1969 establishments in Bihar